Rebekah Del Rio (born 10 July 1967) is an American singer/songwriter and actress from Chula Vista, California.

The San Diego Union-Tribune voted Del Rio one of the "Top 10 Singers in San Diego", after which she moved to Los Angeles in 1989 to further develop her career. After recording the song "Llorando", a Spanish-language version of Roy Orbison's "Crying",  she moved to Nashville in 1994. There, she was signed to Irving Azoff's label, Giant Records, and recorded her first album, Nobody's Angel.  The title track was released on a compilation album and made it to No. 2 on the singles charts in the Netherlands.

Her vocals can be heard on numerous soundtracks including Sin City, Streets of Legend, Man on Fire, and Mia Sarah.  Del Rio made a cameo appearance in David Lynch's 2001 film Mulholland Drive, singing "Llorando" a cappella.  She is also featured in Richard Kelly's film Southland Tales, providing solo vocals in a string arrangement of "The Star-Spangled Banner". She performed the song "No Stars", written in collaboration with David Lynch and John Neff, at the end of Part 10 of Twin Peaks: The Return. Joining Del Rio on stage was the musician Moby on guitar.

Performance in Mulholland Drive film
The filmmaker David Lynch created the scene in the neo-noir film Mulholland Drive in which Del Rio sings in the Club Silencio after hearing her sing "Llorando" at his home studio on the suggestion of the music agent Brian Loucks. Lynch then invited her to perform in the film. Lynch refers to this event as "a happy accident." Del Rio's emotional rendition of the song inspired the creation and development of the scene itself. In his book, The Impossible David Lynch, writer Todd McGowan describes Del Rio's performance with the phrase "the voice as the impossible object." In the nightclub scene, Del Rio is introduced as "La Llorona de Los Ángeles" (Crying Woman from Los Angeles), who belts out the song in a depressive stupor, only to faint onstage while the song continues playing. Film critic Zina Giannopoulou interprets the song's performance and the (symbolic) death of the singer as a parallel to the relationship between the two female doppelgänger characters, Diane/Betty and Rita/Camilla.

Discography
 Nobody's Angel (1994)
 Mulholland Drive Soundtrack - "Llorando" (2001)
 All My Life/Toda Mi Vida (2003)
 Southland Tales Soundtrack - "Star Spangled Banner" (2008)
 Love Hurts Love Heals  (2011)
 Wicked Game - "Llorando" duet with Il Divo  (2011)

See also
 Rabbits

References

External links
 Official website
 

1967 births
Living people
Musicians from San Diego
American women singer-songwriters
Singer-songwriters from California
American musicians of Mexican descent
21st-century American women